Landon Timmonds Ross Jr. (October 19, 1942 – February 7, 2016) was an American environmental biologist. He received master's degrees in geology from Florida State University (FSU master's thesis) and paleontology (Harvard University), and a biology Ph.D. from Florida State (FSU doctoral dissertation), while studying malacology there.

Ross spent his career, between 1970 and 2000, employed as an environmental biologist: as lead biologist with the state of Florida agency regulating the environment (Pollution Control, Environmental Regulation), or as central biology laboratory leader (Environmental Protection). His scientific contributions cover a relatively wide range of subjects, mostly related to Florida's environment.

References

Publications available on-line (partial list)
Florida Dept. Environmental Regulation, Tech. Ser. 10(1) 48pp (1990) "Methods for Aquatic Biology"
Hydrobiologia 71(1-2): 51-60 (with co-authors) (1980) "Diel variations of selected physico-chemical parameters in Lake Kissimmee, Florida"
Nautilus 78(2): 50-52 (1964) "The Land Mollusks of Siesta Key, Sarasota County, Florida"

External links
Enviro-Net 4 Aug 1998  "DEP lab answers call for special services"
First Monday 5:6(6), Stephanie Haas and Priscilla Caplan, Linking Florida's Natural Heritage, June 2000 "Science & Citizenry"
U.S. Environmental Protection Agency "Biological Indicators of Watershed Health"
St. Petersburg Times, 7 Dec 1971 "Dead Fish Glut Peace River"

1942 births
21st-century American biologists
American conservationists
American malacologists
Florida State University alumni
Harvard University alumni
Living people